Gaana is India's largest commercial music streaming service with over 200 million monthly users. It was launched in April 2010 by Times Internet and provides both Indian and international music content. The entire Indian music catalog is available to users worldwide. Gaana features music from 21 Indian languages including the major languages such as Assamese, Bengali, Bhojpuri, English, Gujarati, Hindi, Kannada, Urdu, Odia, Marathi, Punjabi, Tamil, Telugu, Maithili, Malayalam and other Indian regional languages.

Gaana allows users to make their playlists public so that they can be seen by other users. They can view and favorite playlists. Its mobile app was launched to support almost all popular operating systems like Android, iOS and Windows. Gaana became a subscription-only service after failing to secure fresh funds or find a buyer. And it does not provide customers with free streaming from Friday 9 September 2022. Premium version offers Ad-free music, HD quality music streaming and allow users to download songs to play offline.

History
The domain name, Gaana.com, was first registered on 21 June 2005 and was launched in April 2010.

Gaana.com formed a partnership in February 2013 with South Indian Music Companies Association to acquire rights to music from 79 different labels. Consequently, Gaana.com had access to more than 45+ million songs. Gaana generates an annual revenue of US$5 million for Times Internet.

Micromax bought a stake in Gaana.com in October 2015. In February 2018, Tencent also backed the company with an investment of $115 million.

In May 2015, Gaana launched gaming innovation in their music streaming app. The music app has also introduced voice assistant feature.

On 8 July 2020, Gaana debuts a short video platform called HotShots after the Government of India banned Bytedance-owned TikTok. In 2022, Bharti Airtel initiated acquisition talks with Times Internet for Gaana.

References

External links
 

Music streaming services
Online music stores of India
Web portals
Mass media companies based in Mumbai
Internet properties established in 2010
2010 establishments in Maharashtra
Companies of The Times Group